Murat Willis Williams (1919 in Richmond, Virginia – March 31, 1994 in Charlottesville, Virginia) was an American Career Foreign Service officer who was Ambassador to El Salvador from 1961 to 1964.

A graduate of the University of Virginia and a Rhodes Scholar at Oxford for three years, Williams served as a lieutenant commander in the Navy during World War II before joining the Foreign Service.  Williams died of a stroke in Charlottesville, Virginia at the age of 79.

References

External links
Murat W. Williams Oral History Interview –JFK #1, 6/22/1970

University of Virginia alumni
Ambassadors of the United States to El Salvador
United States Foreign Service personnel
1919 births
1994 deaths
People from Richmond, Virginia
20th-century American diplomats
American Rhodes Scholars
United States Navy personnel of World War II